Hannah also spelled Hanna, Hana or Chana, is a feminine given name of Hebrew origin. It is derived from the root ḥ-n-n, meaning "favour" or "grace"; A Dictionary of First Names attributes the name to a word meaning 'He (God) has favoured me with a child'. Anne, Ana, Ann, and other variants of the name derive from the Hellenized Hebrew: Anna (romanization [transcription/transliteration] of Ἅννα [from Greek to Roman {Latin} letters]).

The Phoenician (Punic) name Hannibal derives from the same Canaanite root and means "My grace is Baal". In the Books of Samuel of the Hebrew Bible, Hannah is the mother of the prophet Samuel.

Hannah

People 

 Hannah Adams (1755–1831), American author
 Hannah Aldworth (died 1778), English philanthropist	
 Hannah Allen (1638–1668x1708), British writer
 Hannah Arendt (1906–1975), German philosopher
 Hannah Idowu Dideolu Awolowo (1915–2015), Nigerian businesswoman and politician
 Hannah Brier (born 1998), British sprinter
 Hannah Brown (born 1994), American television personality and model
 Hannah Callowhill Penn (1671–1727), second wife of William Penn
 Hannah Clarke (1988–2020), Australian sportsperson and murder victim 
 Hannah Cowley (1743–1809), American dramatist and poet
 Hannah Dodd (born 1995), English actress
 Hannah Dreier, American journalist
 Hannah Duston (1657–c. 1736), Indian fighter
 Hannah Dakota Fanning (born 1994), American actress, known as Dakota Fanning
 Hannah Ferguson (born 1992), American model
 Hannah Foster (1985–2003), British murder victim
 Hannah Friedman (born 1986), American writer, director, and musician
 Hannah Gadsby (born 1978), Australian comedian
 Hannah Glasse (1708–1770), English cookbook writer
 Hannah Gordon (born 1941), Scottish actress
 Hannah Gross (born 1992), Canadian actress
 Hannah Flagg Gould (1789–1864), American poet
 Hannah Harper (born 1982), English pornographic actress
 Hannah Hart (born 1986), American internet personality, comedian, actress and author
 Hannah Hauxwell (1926-2018), Yorkshire Dales farmer
 Hannah Höch (1889–1978), German Dada artist
 Hannah Hodson (born 1991), American actress, journalist
 Hannah Ild (born 1981), Estonian singer
 Hannah Kallem (1865–1937), Norwegian-born American army nurse
 Hannah T. King (1808–1886), British-American writer, pioneer
 Hannah Lowe (born 1976), British writer
 Hannah Lyman (1816–1871), American educator, biographer
 Hannah Mancini (born 1980), American-Slovenian singer
 Hannah Marks (born 1993), American actress, writer
 Hannah Miley (born 1989), Scottish swimmer
 Hannah More (1745–1833), English religious writer and philanthropist
 Hannah Peel (born 1984), Northern Irish musician
 Hannah Maynard Pickard (1812–1844), American school teacher, preceptress, author
 Hannah Pingree (born 1976), majority leader and Speaker of the House in the Maine House of Representatives
 Hannah Pritchard (1711–1768), English actress
 Hannah Reid (born 1989), English singer of London Grammar
 Hannah Reynolds (soccer) (born 1998), American soccer player
 Hannah Rigby (c.1794–1853), Australian convict 
 Hannah Robinson, British songwriter
 Hannah Rueben (born 1994), Nigerian wrestler
 Hannah Semer (1925–2003), Israeli journalist
 Hannah Spearritt (born 1981), English singer and actress
 Hannah Stockbauer (born 1982), German swimmer
 Hannah Stocking (born 1992), American internet personality, model and actress
 Hannah Storm (born 1962), American co-host of The Early Show
 Hannah Szenes (1921–1944), Hungarian Jew arrested during the Second World War
 Hannah Tan (born 1981), Malaysian singer-songwriter
 Hannah Taylor-Gordon (born 1987) English actress, Anne Frank: The Whole Story
 Hannah Teter (born 1987), American snowboarder
 Hannah Tointon (born 1987), British actress
 Hannah Twynnoy (1669/70–1703), first British person killed by a tiger
 Hannah Tyrrell (born 1990), Irish rugby player
 Hannah Van Buren (1783–1819), wife of the 8th president of the US, Martin Van Buren
 Hannah van der Westhuysen (born 1995), British actress
 Hannah Vogt (1910–1994), German historian
 Hannah Waddingham (born 1974), English actress
 Hannah Webster Foster (1758–1840), American novelist
 Hannah Weiner (1928–1997), American poet
 Hannah Whelan (born 1992), British gymnast
 Hannah Whitall Smith (1832–1911), American lay speaker and author during the Holiness movement
 Hannah Wilke (1940–1993), American painter, sculptor and photographer
 Hannah Wilson (born 1989), Hong Kong swimmer
 Hannah Witton (born 1992), English YouTuber and writer
 Hannah Wood (born 1983), American poet and actress
 Hannah P. Yang, American cancer epidemiologist
 Hannah, Australian pop singer

Biblical figures 
 Hannah (biblical figure), the mother of Samuel from the Books of Samuel
 Saint Anne, mother of Mary, mother of Jesus
 Woman with seven sons, an unnamed Jewish martyr in 2 Maccabees, usually given the name Hannah
 Anna the Prophetess, a prophetess in the Gospel of Luke, spelled Hannah in some translations

Fictional characters 

 Hannah Abbott, character in the Harry Potter series by J. K. Rowling
 Hannah Ashworth, character portrayed by Emma Rigby on the English soap opera Hollyoaks
 Hannah Baker, a character in the novel and Netflix series 13 Reasons Why
 Hannah McKay, character portrayed by Yvonne Strahovski on the Showtime TV series Dexter
 Hannah Martin, character portrayed by Rebecca Ritters on the Australian soap opera Neighbours
 Hannah Montana, alter ego of Miley Cyrus' character Miley Stewart in the television show of the same name
 Hannah Whitehouse, co-protagonist of the Toei anime Futari wa Pretty Cure (originally named Honoka Yukishiro)

Hanna

People
 Hanna Alström (born 1981), Swedish actress
 Hanna Arsenych-Baran (1970–2021), Ukrainian writer of prose, novels and poetry
 Hanna Brooman (1809–1887), Swedish composer, translator and educator
 Hanna Fahl (born 1978), Swedish music journalist and translator
 Hanna Granfelt (1884–1952), Finnish opera singer
 Hanna Grönvall (1879–1953), Swedish politician
 Hanna Hammarström (1829–1909), Swedish inventor
 Hanna Hermansson (born 1989), Swedish runner
 Hanna Hipp, Polish lyric mezzo-soprano
 Hanna Holborn Gray (born 1930), American historian and professor
 Hanna Jaff (born 1986), American born Mexican-Kurd politician, philanthropist, human rights activist, and author
 Hanna Jaltner (born 1976), Swedish breaststroke swimmer
 Hanna Karasiova (born 1978), Belarusian archer
 Hanna Knyazyeva-Minenko (born 1989), Israeli triple jumper and long jumper
 Hanna Lindberg (1865–1951), Swedish politician, first woman on a communal council (1910)
 Hanna Ljungberg (born 1979), Swedish soccer player
 Hanna Maron (1923–2014), Israeli actress
 Hanna Neumann (1914–1971), German-born mathematician 
 Hanna Newcombe (1922–2011), Canadian peace activist
 Hanna Pakarinen (born 1981), Finnish pop singer
 Hanna van Recklinghausen (1332–?), Dutch banker
 Hanna Reitsch (1912–1979), German test pilot
 Hanna Rieber (1927–2014), Romanian-born Israeli actress
 Hanna Rovina (1892–1980), Israeli actress and original "First Lady of Hebrew Theatre"
 Hanna Scheuring (born 1965), Swiss actress and theatre director 
 Hanna Schygulla (born 1943), German actress and singer
 Hanna Sheehy-Skeffington (1877–1946), Irish feminist, wife of Francis Sheehy-Skeffington
 Hanna Suchocka (born 1946), Prime Minister of Poland from 1992–1993
 Hanna Stadnik (1929–2020), Polish activist
 Hanna Styrell (1842–1904), Swedish actress
 Hanna Wolf (1908–1999), East German historian and politician
 Hanna Yablonska (1981–2011), Ukrainian playwright and poet

Saint and Blessed 

 Hanna Helena Chrzanowska (1902–1973), nurse and professed member of the Benedictine oblates

Fictional characters
 Hanna (character), titular character in the film bearing her name and the TV series based on it. Portrayed by Saoirse Ronan (film) and Esmé Creed-Miles (series)
 Hanna Marin, character from the TV and book series Pretty Little Liars and in the TV series is portrayed by Ashley Benson
 Hannah Fleishman, character in the book Fleishman Is in Trouble and the TV adaptation. She is portrayed in the TV series by Meara Mahoney Gross. 
 Hannah, a character in Arrival.

See also
 Anna (given name)
Ana (given name)
 Hanna (surname)
 Johanna
 Nancy (given name)

References

English feminine given names
Jewish feminine given names
Given names
Hebrew feminine given names